Salt balance may refer to
Osmoregulation
Soil salinity
Salt balance in the soil

See also
 Soil salinity control